Municipal elections in Barcelona are held every four years to elect the city council. The mayor is elected indirectly by the councillors on the first plenary session of the term.

Overview
The basic level of Spanish local government are the municipalities (Spanish: municipios, Catalan: municipis). The city of Barcelona constitutes a municipality. The reigning institution in Barcelona is called Ajuntament de Barcelona, and is formed by the mayor (Catalan: alcalde, fem. alcaldessa), the government (Catalan: Comissió de govern, although it is commonly known as Govern municipal) and the legislature or city council (Catalan: Consell Municipal, although it is commonly known as Ple de l'Ajuntament).

Local elections in Spain are regulated by the LOREG law. Municipal elections are held every 4 years on the last Sunday of May, in all the municipalities of Spain at the same time, together with other regional elections (though not in Catalonia) and other local-level elections, such as comarcal or provincial council elections. If European elections are scheduled to take place on the same dates, local elections must be held the same day with European Parliament elections.

The size of the legislature is determined by the population count on 1 January before the election. In Barcelona, the city council currently has 41 members.
Voters elect only the members of the city council; the mayor is elected indirectly. Voting is non-compulsory. Local councillors are elected using the D'Hondt method and a closed-list proportional representation, with a threshold of 5 percent of valid votes, which include blank ballots.

The mayor is elected on the first plenary session of the term by the city councillors in a single-round election. If any candidate obtains an absolute majority of the votes, the candidate of the most voted party is elected as a mayor. After the plenary session, the Mayor chooses councillors to be in the government executive.

Since the restoration of democracy after the fascist dictatorship of Francisco Franco, elections have taken place on 3 April 1979, 8 May 1983, 10 June 1987, 26 May 1991, 28 May 1995, 13 June 1999, 25 May 2003, 27 May 2007, 22 May 2011, 24 May 2015 and 26 May 2019; the next scheduled election will be on 28 May 2023.

Results

2015 election

Historical composition of the City Council

1901–1939
Until Primo de Rivera's dictatorship, only one half of the council was renewed at every election. The numbers below indicate the total seats after the election.

After 1979

See also
 List of mayors of Barcelona
 Politics of Catalonia
 Elections in Spain

External links
 General Directorate of Domestic Politics, archived results back to 1976

References

Barcelona
Elections in Barcelona